Oreocereus is a genus of cacti (family Cactaceae), known only from high altitudes of the Andes.
Its name means "mountain cereus", formed from the Greek prefix  (mountain) and the New Latin , meaning wax or torch.

As they are covered with woolly white fuzz (modified spines), a few species in this genus are sometimes known as the old-man cactus, a generic name that also refers to Cephalocereus senilis or Espostoa lanata. More rarely, the old man of the mountain is also used for some species.

Species

Synonymy
The following genera have been included in this genus:
Arequipa Britton & Rose
Arequipiopsis Kreuz. & Buining
Morawetzia Backeb.
Submatucana Backeb.

References

Trichocereeae
Cacti of South America
Flora of the Andes
Cactoideae genera